Dog show can refer to:

Sports and events 
Conformation show, the most-common meaning of "dog show," in which dogs are rated for how well their appearance conforms to their breed standard
Westminster Kennel Club Dog Show, one of the oldest and most prestigious conformation shows
Dog agility trial, a dog sport in which a handler directs a dog through an obstacle course
Field trial, a competitive event at which hunting dogs compete against one another
Novelty show, a competition or display in which exhibits or specimens are in some way novel
Obedience trial, a dog sport in which a dog executes a predefined set of tasks when directed to do so by his handler
Sheepdog trial, a competitive dog sport in which herding dogs move sheep, as directed by their handlers
Specialty show, a dog show which reviews a single breed 
Tracking trial, an event where dogs make use the ability to follow a food trail
World's Ugliest Dog Contest, a dog show for ugly and weird dogs

Arts, entertainment, and media 
Dog Show (album), the third album by God Bullies (1990)
"Dog Show", a recurring sketch on Saturday Night Live

Other uses
Dog and pony show, a colloquial term

See also
Best of Breed
Best in Show (film)
Breed Groups (dog)
Dog sports
General Specials
Horse show
Show (disambiguation)

Dog shows and showing